Marina Novak (born 30 May 1991) is a professional female tennis player from Liechtenstein.

On 8 June 2009, she peaked at world number 988 in the doubles rankings. Playing for Liechtenstein at the Fed Cup, Novak has a win–loss record of 15–9.

Career 
Novak had a successful junior career, winning one ITF doubles titles. Her career-high world ranking as a junior was world number 454, and she finished her junior career with a record of 36–33. At the 2007 Games of the Small States of Europe, held in Liechtenstein, Novak won two medals. She won the 2009 Games of the Small States of Europe, Novak singles bronze and doubles Silver medals.

Fed Cup participation

Singles

Doubles

ITF Junior Finals

Doubles: 2 (1–1)

Other finals

Doubles

References

External links 
 
 
 

1991 births
Living people
Liechtenstein female tennis players